Ganesh Lal Agrawal College, established in 1954, is a general degree college in Medininagar, Jharkhand. It offers undergraduate courses in arts, commerce and sciences. It is affiliated to  Nilamber-Pitamber University.

See also
Education in India
Literacy in India
List of institutions of higher education in Jharkhand

References

External links
Ganesh Lal Agrawal College

Colleges affiliated to Nilamber-Pitamber University
Universities and colleges in Jharkhand
Medininagar
Educational institutions established in 1954
1954 establishments in Bihar